Number One Surprise is a Chinese comedy variety show television series developed by Jason Goldberg and produced by STXtelevision and XG Entertainment. It premiered on Hunan TV, Mango TV and PPTV on 21 November 2016. It had almost 300 million viewers on its premiere and, as of January 2017, was the most watched program on Hunan TV. It was cancelled after 4 episodes on TV and went straight to online only broadcast.

References

Chinese comedy television series
Chinese variety television shows
Hunan Television original programming
2016 Chinese television series debuts
STX Entertainment
Mandarin-language television shows